Ursula is a large crater on Uranus's moon Titania. It is about 135 km across, and is cut by Belmont Chasma. It is named after Hero's attendant in William Shakespeare's comedy Much Ado About Nothing.

Ursula has a central pit with diameter of about 20 km. It is probably one of the youngest large impact craters on Titania. The crater is surrounded by smooth plains, which have the lowest impact crater density of all geological units on the moon, although they are cut by Belmont Chasma. The plains may be impact deposits (ejecta) associated with Ursula or they may be cryovolcanic in origin.

References 

Explanatory notes

Citations

Sources

 
 

Impact craters on Uranus' moons
Titania (moon)